This is the list of manufacturers of solid-state drives (SSDs) for computers and other electronic devices that require data storage. In the list those manufacturers that also produce hard disk drives or flash memory are identified. Additionally, the type of memory used in their solid-state drives is noted. This list does not include the manufacturers of specific components of SSDs, such as flash memory controllers.

See also 
 History of hard disk drives
 List of computer hardware manufacturers
 List of defunct hard disk manufacturers

References 

 
Lists of computer hardware
Lists of consumer electronics manufacturers
Lists of manufacturers
Manufacturers